Pyrgotoides paradoxus is a species of tephritid or fruit flies in the genus Pyrgotoides of the family Tephritidae.

Distribution
Bolivia.

References

Tephritinae
Insects described in 1942
Diptera of South America